Francesco Stanco (born 26 February 1987) is an Italian footballer who plays as a forward for  club Carpi.

Club career
He made his Serie B debut for Modena in the 2005–06 season.

On 5 August 2019, he joined Serie C club Feralpisalò.

On 15 January 2020, he returned to Cittadella in Serie B.

On 1 October 2020, he signed a two-year contract with Imolese. On 5 January 2021, he joined Alessandria on loan until the end of the season.

On 12 July 2022, Stanco moved to Carpi in Serie D.

International career
Stanco was a youth international for Italy U-18.

References

External links
 

1987 births
Living people
Sportspeople from the Province of Modena
Footballers from Emilia-Romagna
Italian footballers
Association football forwards
Serie B players
Serie C players
Modena F.C. players
F.C. Grosseto S.S.D. players
Valenzana Mado players
Pisa S.C. players
A.S. Cittadella players
U.S. Cremonese players
A.S. Sambenedettese players
FeralpiSalò players
Imolese Calcio 1919 players
U.S. Alessandria Calcio 1912 players
A.C. Carpi players
Italy youth international footballers